Colusa County Airport  is a public airport located three miles (4.8 km) south of Colusa, serving Colusa County, California, United States. It is mostly used for general aviation.

Facilities 
Colusa County Airport covers 81 acres and has one runway:

 Runway 13/31: 3,000 x 60 ft (914 x 18 m), surface: asphalt

References

External links 

Airports in California
Buildings and structures in Colusa County, California
Colusa, California
Transportation in Colusa County, California